The 2011 IPP Trophy was a professional tennis tournament played on clay courts. It was the 24th edition of the tournament which is part of the 2011 ATP Challenger Tour. It took place in Geneva, Switzerland between 7 and 13 November 2011.

ATP entrants

Seeds

 1 Rankings are as of October 31, 2011.

Other entrants
The following players received wildcards into the singles main draw:
  Stéphane Bohli
  Evgeny Donskoy
  Michael Lammer
  Alexander Sadecky

The following players received entry from the qualifying draw:
  Holger Fischer
  Albano Olivetti
  Clément Reix
  Mischa Zverev

Champions

Singles

 Malek Jaziri def.  Mischa Zverev, 4–6, 6–3, 6–3

Doubles

 Igor Andreev /  Evgeny Donskoy def.  James Cerretani /  Adil Shamasdin, 7–6(7–1), 7–6(7–2)

External links
Official Website
ITF Search 
ATP official site

IPP Trophy
Geneva Open Challenger